Wayne Dobbs (June 12, 1939 – February 10, 2015) was an American college basketball and baseball coach.  He served as head basketball coach at Belmont University, George Washington University and Vanderbilt University. Dobbs died on February 10, 2015.

References

1939 births
2015 deaths
Belmont Bruins baseball coaches
Belmont Bruins men's basketball coaches
College men's basketball head coaches in the United States
George Washington Colonials men's basketball coaches
Oglethorpe Stormy Petrels baseball players
Oglethorpe Stormy Petrels men's basketball players
Vanderbilt Commodores men's basketball coaches
American men's basketball players